Tim Gepp (born 21 January 1960) is a former Australian rules footballer who played for  and  in the Victorian Football League (VFL), and  and  in the West Australian Football League (WAFL).

Gepp, a half-back flanker, played 84 games for Subiaco between 1978 and 1982. He was then transferred to Richmond in 1983 and played in the opening round. Despite missing only one game in 1984 and playing every game in 1985, he was sacked by Richmond prior to the 1986 season due to salary cap problems, and signed with Footscray.

When Mick Malthouse, Gepp's coach at Footscray, became coach of the West Coast Eagles in 1990, Gepp was appointed as a skills coach.  He remained at the Eagles for almost twenty years, becoming chairman of the selectors and being awarded life membership in 2007.

References

1960 births
Living people
Richmond Football Club players
Western Bulldogs players
East Fremantle Football Club players
Subiaco Football Club players
West Coast Eagles administrators
Australian rules footballers from Western Australia